

Incumbents
 President – Igor Dodon (until December 24), Maia Sandu (starting December 24)
 Prime Minister – Ion Chicu (until December 31), Aureliu Ciocoi (starting December 31, acting)
 President of the Parliament – Zinaida Greceanîi

Events
1 November – 2020 Moldovan presidential election.
15 November – Maia Sandu is elected as the president of the country
24 December – The inauguration of Maia Sandu as President of Moldova took place, she became the first female president of the country

Deaths

 13 January – Ștefan Petrache, singer (b. 1949)
22 March – Petru Bogatu, journalist and writer (b. 1951)
8 April – Valeriu Muravschi, politician and businessman (b. 1949)
25 May – Nadejda Brânzan, politician (b. 1948)
3 June – Valentina Tăzlăuanu, writer and journalist (b. 1950)
13 October – Veaceslav Semionov, footballer and manager (b. 1956)
22 November – Elena Hrenova, politician (b. 1950)

References

 
2020s in Moldova
Years of the 21st century in Moldova
Moldova
Moldova